Zlatko Zahovič (born 1 February 1971) is a Slovenian former professional footballer who played as an attacking midfielder.

After making a name for himself in Europe in Portugal, most notably with Porto and Benfica where he amassed Primeira Liga totals of 246 matches and 54 goals over one full decade, he went on to have brief stints in Spain and Greece. He was known for dribbling and goal-scoring ability alike. Although primarily a midfielder, he scored 11 goals in 32 Champions League appearances and 35 in 80 for the Slovenian national team.

The all-time record holder in goals for Slovenia, Zahovič was an essential member of the squad as they qualified for the first time ever to a European Championship and a World Cup, in the early 2000s.

Club career

Partizan
Zahovič was born in Maribor, Socialist Federal Republic of Yugoslavia. In 1989, the 18-year-old NK Kovinar Maribor player was noticed by FK Partizan's Milko Ǵurovski, at the time doing his mandatory military service in the town, who recommended the youngster to the club.

With the Belgrade team, he was relatively used over the course of three seasons – he also played one year on loan for FK Proleter Zrenjanin – contributing 15 games and three goals as they won the 1992–93 national championship.

Portugal
In the summer of 1993, aged 22, Zahovič moved to Portugal and joined Vitória de Guimarães. On matchday 32 of the 1995–96 campaign, he scored the winning goal in a 3–2 away win over FC Porto. This performance convinced the former to sign him that summer, after an acrimonious transfer saga; he led his side to two UEFA Cup qualifications during his three-year spell.

Zahovič was equally important while at Porto, forming a formidable attacking partnership with Capucho, Ljubinko Drulović and Mário Jardel and winning three consecutive league titles whilst rarely missing a match. In his last year he netted a career-best goals, and 22 across all competitions. He added seven during the 1998–99 UEFA Champions League, thus finishing third in the competition's scoring charts behind FC Dynamo Kyiv's Andriy Shevchenko and Dwight Yorke of Manchester United, who both scored eight – the northerners, however, did not make it past the group stage.

Olympiacos
In 1999, Zahovič signed for Olympiacos F.C. for a fee of £10m, this being at the time the highest sum paid for a Slovenian player. However, his year in Greece was marred by hefty fines and a lengthy suspension, for questioning the tactics of Alberto Bigon.

Zahovič also fell out with Bigon's predecessor, Dušan Bajević, for returning late from a holiday.

Valencia
After only one season, Zahovič moved to Spain's Valencia CF for a fee of £5.5m. His new team reached the final of the 2000–01 Champions League, lost after a penalty shootout against FC Bayern Munich where he had his attempt saved by Oliver Kahn.

Again Zahovič clashed with his manager, Héctor Cúper, claiming he was not being given enough opportunities. Additionally, in October 2000, he was not picked up for a game at his former club for fear of reprisals from its supporters.

Benfica
In June 2001, Zahovič returned to Portugal and joined S.L. Benfica, as Carlos Marchena moved to Valencia. He was an important first-team member in his first three seasons, but lost his importance when manager Giovanni Trapattoni arrived at the Estádio da Luz, a situation which was aggravated in January 2005 with the purchase of Nuno Assis. This in part resulted in a mutual termination of his contract, five months before it was due to expire.

International career
Zahovič's first match for Slovenia was on 7 November 1992, a friendly match with Cyprus. The national team qualified for UEFA Euro 2000 in Belgium and the Netherlands, with the player scoring nine goals in 15 games. In the finals he continued to excel, netting three of the side's four goals in an eventual group stage exit where his performances earned him comparisons to David Beckham.

Slovenia also managed to qualify for the 2002 FIFA World Cup in South Korea and Japan, another first. However, after being replaced by manager Srečko Katanec in the 63rd minute of the first group fixture against Spain (1–3 loss), Zahovič insulted the coach, who immediately sent him home following the match.

Zahovič retired from the national team in December 2003, but reversed his decision two months later. He made his last appearance on 28 April 2004 against Switzerland, and totalled 80 caps and 35 goals (at the time both records), which made him the most successful Slovenian footballer since the country's independence in 1991 and the inception of its football association into FIFA the following year; his international appearances total was surpassed by Boštjan Cesar on 15 November 2014.

Administrative career
Immediately after his retirement from professional football, in June 2005 at the age of 34, according to an interview with Pozareport.si, Zahovič was offered a head coach position of the Benfica juniors, but opted for a return to his homeland where, in 2007, he became the director of football at NK Maribor. He remained in that position until March 2020. Under his guidance, the club won eight Slovenian PrvaLiga titles, reached the UEFA Champions League group stages twice (2014–15 and 2017–18) and the knockout phase of the UEFA Europa League in 2013–14.

Personal life
Zahovič's son, Luka, is also a footballer. A striker, he too represented Slovenia at international level. When Luka scored a late equaliser in a Champions League group stage match between Maribor and Sporting CP, on 17 September 2014, the two became only the second father and son pair – first among Europeans – to have both scored in the competition since 1992 when the competition was established in its current format.

In his young years, Zahovič played chess and practised ski jumping.

Career statistics

Club

International

Scores and results list Slovenia's goal tally first, score column indicates score after each Zahovič goal.

Honours
Partizan
First League of Serbia and Montenegro: 1992–93
Yugoslav Cup: 1991–92

Porto
Primeira Liga: 1996–97, 1997–98, 1998–99
Taça de Portugal: 1997–98
Supertaça Cândido de Oliveira: 1996, 1998, 1999

Olympiacos
Super League Greece: 1999–2000

Valencia
UEFA Champions League runner-up: 2000–01

Benfica
Primeira Liga: 2004–05
Taça de Portugal: 2003–04
Supertaça Cândido de Oliveira runner-up: 2004

Limbuš Pekre
Slovenian Intercommunal Leagues: 2009–10

See also
Slovenian international players

References

External links
 
 
 

1971 births
Living people
Slovenian people of Serbian descent
Sportspeople from Maribor
Yugoslav footballers
Slovenian footballers
Association football midfielders
Yugoslav First League players
NK Maribor players
FK Partizan players
FK Proleter Zrenjanin players
Primeira Liga players
Vitória S.C. players
FC Porto players
S.L. Benfica footballers
Super League Greece players
Olympiacos F.C. players
La Liga players
Valencia CF players
Slovenia international footballers
UEFA Euro 2000 players
2002 FIFA World Cup players
Competitors at the 1993 Mediterranean Games
Mediterranean Games competitors for Slovenia
Slovenian expatriate footballers
Expatriate footballers in Serbia and Montenegro
Expatriate footballers in Portugal
Expatriate footballers in Greece
Expatriate footballers in Spain
Slovenian expatriate sportspeople in Serbia and Montenegro
Slovenian expatriate sportspeople in Portugal
Slovenian expatriate sportspeople in Greece
Slovenian expatriate sportspeople in Spain